Alzira Coelho de Campos de Barros de Abreu Costa (20 April 1875 – 21 February 1970) was the wife of Portuguese politician Afonso Costa.

Biography
Alzira de Barros de Abreu was born in 1875, in Oliveira do Hospital, in Coimbra, the daughter of Albano Mendes de Abreu, a medical doctor, and his wife, Emília de Barros Coelho de Campos. She was the sister of the writer and politician José de Barros Mendes de Abreu, who was born on 20 July 1878.

She married Afonso Costa in the New Cathedral of Coimbra, on 15 September 1892. In 1916, she was one of the founders of the Portuguese Women's Crusade.

She died at the age of 94, in Nossa Senhora de Fátima, Lisbon.

References

1875 births
1970 deaths
People from Oliveira do Hospital
Spouses of prime ministers of Portugal